Ilford North is a constituency created in 1945 and represented in the House of Commons of the UK Parliament since 2015 by Wes Streeting of the Labour Party.

History
The seat was created for the 1945 general election, from the northern part of the former Ilford seat.

Constituency profile
All districts are suburban but interspersed with many parks and a few small nature reserves and are connected to Central London by the Central line (London Underground) which forms an end loop around Hainault tube station.  The vast majority of Ilford North's housing is houses of terraced or semi-detached type having typically small and narrow gardens.  As at the 2011 census, mid-rise apartments in modest landscaped grounds form the bulk of the type of flats in the seat as opposed to tower blocks.

Political history
The seat has fluctuated since 1945 between Labour and Conservative representation in the House of Commons.  The 2015 result made the seat the 8th narrowest win of Labour's 232 seats by percentage of majority, and in first past the post a 1.2% majority would be considered marginal. The 2017 election saw an 8.5% swing to Labour, increasing their margin in the seat to 9,639 votes (18.2%), the largest majority for a Labour MP in the seat's history. Labour's majority was almost halved during the 2019 general election.

Boundaries

1945–1950: The Municipal Borough of Ilford wards of Barkingside, North Hainault, Seven Kings, and South Hainault.

1950–1974: The Municipal Borough of Ilford wards of Barkingside, Clayhall, Fairlop, North Hainault, Seven Kings, and South Hainault.

1974–1983: The London Borough of Redbridge wards of Aldborough, Barkingside, Chadwell, Fairlop, Hainault, and Seven Kings.

1983–1997: As above plus Fullwell

1997–present: Aldborough, Barkingside, Bridge, Clayhall, Fairlop, Fullwell, Hainault, and Roding.

Members of Parliament

Election results

Elections in the 2010s

Elections in the 2000s

Elections in the 1990s

Elections in the 1980s

Elections in the 1970s

Elections in the 1960s

Elections in the 1950s

Elections in the 1940s

See also
Ilford South
List of parliamentary constituencies in London

Notes

References

External links 
Politics Resources (Election results from 1922 onwards)
Electoral Calculus (Election results from 1955 onwards)

Politics of the London Borough of Redbridge
Parliamentary constituencies in London
Constituencies of the Parliament of the United Kingdom established in 1945
Ilford